Trine Tangeraas (born 26 February 1971 in Kristiansand) is a Norwegian footballer and olympic medalist.

She received a bronze medal at the 1996 Summer Olympics in Atlanta.

References

External links
 
 

1971 births
Living people
Norwegian women's footballers
Footballers at the 1996 Summer Olympics
Olympic footballers of Norway
Olympic bronze medalists for Norway
Olympic medalists in football
Medalists at the 1996 Summer Olympics
Norway women's international footballers
Women's association footballers not categorized by position
Sportspeople from Kristiansand